Bija is a limited-release down tempo electro-pop song project, created in 2000 by Annabelle Chvostek in collaboration with electro-acoustic producer Ned Bouhalassa.

Track listing
"'Thanatology'"  – 4:41
"'Silence & Love'"  – 5:13
"'Free Ride'"  – 6:37
"'Ne Dis Rien'" (film soundtrack)  – 3:52

Annabelle Chvostek albums
2000 albums